Ahornsee is a mountain lake of Upper Austria.

Lakes of Upper Austria
LAhornsee